Inga Khrushchova (also Inha Khrushchova, born 18 December 1970) is a Belarusian political activist and journalist, formerly one of the key propagandists of the regime of Alexander Lukashenko in the 1990s.

Biography

Khrushchova graduated from the Vitsebsk State School of Olympic Reserve and holds several sports awards from the Belarusian SSR.

She later graduated from the Faculty of Journalism of the Belarusian State University and pursued a career in journalism.

Between 1995 and 2001, Khrushchova was a daily prime time news presenter on BT, the Lukashenka-controlled national television of Belarus. She was later part of Lukashenka's presidential press corps, covering his daily work and accompanying him during visits in various regions of Belarus. Eventually, Khrushchova became head of political coverage at the news agency of the state TV and radio broadcasting company of Belarus.

Independent Belarusian media refers to Khrushchova as "one of the most active propagandists of the Lukashenka regime in the 1990s and 2000s" and "one of the symbols of propaganda on Belarusian state TV".

After leaving state television

In 2013, Khrushchova left Belarusian TV to work in private business. She has been an active public critic of the Lukashenka regime since then.

In the run-up to the 2020 Belarusian presidential election, she joined the election campaign of Viktar Babaryka, one of opposition candidates. She signed a petition of Belarusian athletes demanding fair elections and motivated employees of state propaganda to leave their jobs and participated in nationwide mass protests against the regime of Lukashenka.

After the election, she moved to Germany and joined the activities of the Belarusian diaspora.

See also
 Propaganda in Belarus

References

Belarusian propagandists
Belarusian State University alumni
1970 births
Living people
Belarusian athletes
Belarusian expatriates in Germany